Kálmán Tolnai (28 November 1924 – 14 September 2010) was a Hungarian sailor. He competed at the 1960 Summer Olympics and the 1968 Summer Olympics.

References

External links
 

1924 births
2010 deaths
Hungarian male sailors (sport)
Olympic sailors of Hungary
Sailors at the 1960 Summer Olympics – Finn
Sailors at the 1968 Summer Olympics – Star
People from Balatonfüred
Sportspeople from Veszprém County